Sándor Gáspár (born 9 April 1956) is a Hungarian actor. He appeared in more than seventy films since 1978. His brother Tibor Gáspár is also an actor.

Selected filmography

References

External links 

1956 births
Living people
Hungarian male film actors